Donald Richard Deskins Jr. (May 10, 1932 – February 26, 2013) was an American professor of urban geography and sociology and a former American football player. He was born in Brooklyn, New York, in 1932 and attended Westbury High School. He served in the United States Marine Corps before enrolling at the University of Michigan in 1957. He received several degrees from the University of Michigan, including a Bachelor of Arts degree in 1960, a Master of Arts degree in 1963, and a Ph.D. in 1971.  During his undergraduate study at Michigan, Deskins played college football as a tackle for the Michigan Wolverines football teams in 1958 and 1959. After receiving his bachelor's degree in 1960, he played professional football for the Oakland Raiders in their inaugural season in the American Football League.  Deskins has published extensively. His works include:
Letters to President Obama (2009), co-authored with Hanes Walton and Josephine A. V. Allen
Presidential Elections, 1789-2008, co-authored with Hanes Walton and Sherman Puckett
Residential mobility of Negroes in Detroit, 1837-1965 (1972)
Negro settlement in Ann Arbor (1962)
Interaction patterns and the spatial form of the ghetto (1970), co-authored with David Ward and Harold M. Rose
Geographical literature on the American Negro, 1949-1968 (1969)

Notes

1932 births
2013 deaths
American geographers
American sociologists
Michigan Wolverines football players
Oakland Raiders players
Sportspeople from Brooklyn
Players of American football from New York City
University of Michigan faculty